The Bridge-Jay Street station was a station on the demolished BMT Myrtle Avenue Line in Brooklyn, New York City. It had 2 tracks and 1 island platform. It was opened on April 10, 1888 as Jay Street, and served Myrtle Avenue Line trains as well as the BMT Lexington Avenue Line, and until it was demolished in 1940, the BMT Fifth Avenue Line, which itself also served BMT Culver Line trains. From 1944 until its demolition in 1969, it had a free transfer to the IND Fulton Street and IND Culver lines at Jay Street – Borough Hall. Around that time, it was renamed "Bridge-Jay Street." The next stop to the north was Navy Street for trains traveling on the Lexington & Myrtle Avenue Lines, and Fulton Street other trains until its demolition in 1940. The next stop to the south was Adams Street. The station was closed on October 4, 1969, after a fire on the elevated structure.

References

 
 
 

Defunct BMT Myrtle Avenue Line stations
Railway stations closed in 1969
Railway stations in the United States opened in 1888
1888 establishments in New York (state)
1969 disestablishments in New York (state)
Former elevated and subway stations in Brooklyn